Dominique Jennings (born 30 October 1965) is an American actress. She played Virginia Harrison in NBC soap opera Sunset Beach.

Life and career
Jennings was born in Stockholm, Sweden. Her mother, Ann-Charlotte Dahlqvist, was a Swedish flight attendant, and father, Richard Slater Jennings, was an American artist and journalist. Her mother was killed in January 1969 when the plane she was on crashed into the ocean while taking off from Los Angeles. Jennings moved back to the United States with her father in 1971.

Jennings began her career playing secondary roles in films include Bad Influence, Die Hard 2 (both 1990), A Low Down Dirty Shame (1994) and Seven (1995). On television, she guest-starred on Living Single, Martin, The Fresh Prince of Bel-Air, The Wayans Bros., and The Jamie Foxx Show. In 1997, she was cast as Virginia Harrison in the NBC soap opera, Sunset Beach. Jennings was cast into the role of Virginia after she auditioned for another part in the program. She was originally contracted to appear in ten episodes of the program. However, after her first day on set, Jennings was offered a three-year contract, which she accepted. In February 1999, it was announced that Sunset Beach had decided to end Jennings' contract with the serial, after they axed Virginia from the series. However, producers decided to not to kill her off and did not rule out a future return. 
She was nominated in 1999 for a Soap Opera Digest Awards at the 15th Soap Opera Digest Awards for Outstanding Villainess.

Jennings voiced Wanda Blake in the HBO adult animated superhero series, Todd McFarlane's Spawn from 1997 to 1999. Her other credits including animated series The Zeta Project (2002), video games 50 Cent: Bulletproof (2005) and Tom Clancy's EndWar (2008), and animated film The Ice Age Adventures of Buck Wild (2022).

Filmography
 Bad Influence (1990) .... Woman at Tar Pit
 Die Hard 2 (1990) .... Newscaster (WZDC)
 Knots Landing (1 episode, "The Question Game", 1991) .... Reporter #3
 Living Single (1 episode, "Full Court Press", 1993) .... Girl #1
 A Low Down Dirty Shame (1994) .... Funeral Guest
 Sketch Artist II: Hands That See (1995) (TV) .... Todd
 Martin (1 episode, "The Ex-files", 1995) .... Carla
 The Fresh Prince of Bel-Air (1 episode, "A Decent Proposal", 1995) .... Therapist
 Se7en (1995) .... TV News Reporter
 Hang Time (1 episode, "The Candidate", 1995) .... Miss Desiree
 Baywatch Nights (1 episode, "Vengeance", 1996) .... Lea Jane Broussard
 The Wayans Bros. (1 episode, "Goin' to the Net", 1996) .... Ina
 Life with Roger (1 episode, "The Boxer Rebellion", 1997) .... Linda
 Sunset Beach (204 episodes, 1997–1999) .... Virginia Harrison
 Todd McFarlane's Spawn (18 episodes, 1997–1999) .... Wanda Blake
 The Jamie Foxx Show (1 episode, "Why Don't We Just Roll... Reversal", 1999) .... Karen
 Angel (1 episode, "Parting Gifts", 1999) .... Mac
 Dead Last (1 episode, "Death Is in the Air", 2001) .... Stewardess
 That's Life (1 episode, "What's Family Got to Do with It?", 2002) .... Receptionist
 The Zeta Project (3 episodes, "Wired: Part 1", "Wired: Part 2" and "On the Wire", 2001–2003) .... Agent Rush
 44 Minutes: The North Hollywood Shoot-Out (2003) (TV) .... News Anchor
 50 Cent: Bulletproof (2005) (VG) .... Alexa (voice)
 Luke 11:17 (1 episode, "Crucified Between Two Thieves", 2008) Thanks
 Body of Proof (1 episode, "Your Number's Up", 2011) Linda Gleason
 The Ice Age Adventures of Buck Wild (2022) .... Ellie (voice)

References

External links
 

American film actresses
American soap opera actresses
American television actresses
Living people
Swedish emigrants to the United States
1965 births
Actresses from Stockholm
21st-century American women